On 20 November 2016, the Indore–Patna Express 19321, a scheduled train from Indore to Patna, derailed near Pukhrayan, Kanpur, India, resulting in at least 150 deaths and more than 150 injuries. It is the deadliest train accident in India since 1999, when the Gaisal train disaster claimed 290 lives.

Accident 

The Indore–Patna Express travels twice a week between Indore Junction railway station and Rajendra Nagar Terminal in Patna. At approximately 03:10 local time on 20 November, the train derailed in the town of Pukhrayan near the city of Kanpur. Fourteen carriages were derailed and early reports had at least 120 people killed and over 260 injured, with the death toll later rising to 150, and injured reduced to 150 people.

According to officials, most of the casualties were from two severely damaged coaches, namely S1 and S2 of sleeper class, and heavy machinery was being used to rescue passengers trapped in the train.

Aftermath 
The rescue and  operations were carried out by the Indian Army, the National Disaster Response Force, teams of doctors and local police. Rail mobile-medical units were also on site. Helpline numbers for those affected by the derailment were issued by Indian Railways.

Indian Prime Minister Narendra Modi said that he was "Anguished beyond words on the loss of lives due to the derailing of the Indore–Patna Express"  and added that his "thoughts are with the bereaved families", in a tweet. The Railways Minister Suresh Prabhu tweeted, "Strictest possible action will be taken against those who could be responsible for accident".

Compensation 
As the rescue operation was underway, the Indian Railways, Prime Minister Narendra Modi and chief ministers across the states of Madhya Pradesh, Uttar Pradesh and Bihar announced ex-gratia payments for the victims of the accident. Earlier on 1 September 2016, the Indian Railways had launched an optional insurance scheme at a low premium.

Investigation 
Within hours of the incident, the central government ordered an investigation to probe the cause of the accident, which was unclear. Some sources speculated the train to have been overcrowded; sources in the railways suspected rail fracture might have caused the train to skid off.  Some survivors claimed that one of the coaches was making noise and that its wheels were not running smoothly.

Another train derailed on 28 December 2016,  from Kanpur. Both accidents were thought to have been caused by fractured tracks. In January 2017, after deliberately damaged track was found in time to avoid a third derailment, three suspects arrested for placing a bomb on rail tracks near Ghorasahan, Motilal Paswan, Umashankar Patel and Mukesh Yadav, were implicated in the two Kanpur derailments. They admitted working for Inter-Services Intelligence of Pakistan. According to a police officer, although no evidence of explosives had been found in connection with the two Kanpur derailments, audio recovered from one of the suspects' cellphones suggested they were involved in them. Brij Kishore Giri, a Nepalese suspected of being the men's "handler", was arrested in Nepal, as was Shamsul Huda, suspected of masterminding the plot, after he had been deported from Dubai.

In October 2018, the National Investigation Agency (NIA) decided not to file a chargesheet for the case as there was no indication of any sabotage or explosion in the accident.

See also
 2016 Eséka train derailment, another deadly derailment a few weeks earlier
 List of deadliest rail accidents
 List of Indian rail incidents

References

2016 disasters in India
History of Uttar Pradesh (1947–present)
November 2016 events in India
Railway accidents in 2016
Railway accidents and incidents in Uttar Pradesh
Kanpur Dehat district
Derailments in India